Blue Byrd is the thirty-seventh album by American jazz guitarist Charlie Byrd. He is joined by his brother, Joe Byrd, on bass and Wayne Phillips on drums for this recording.

Critical reception

Scott Yanow of AllMusic writes that "This delightful LP is one of Charlie Byrd's finest albums for Concord."

An article about Jazz Guitar from All About Jazz remarks, "A great Charlie Byrd album is Blue Byrd (Concord Jazz, 1978)."

Track listing

Musicians
Charlie Byrd: Guitar
Gene “Joe” Byrd: Bass, Vocals on I Ain't Got Nothin' but the Blues
Wayne Phillips: Drums

Production
Carl E. Jefferson: Producer
Phil Edwards: Mixer, Recording Engineer
Judy O'Rourke: Design/Illustration

All track information and credits were taken from the CD liner notes and verified against the Discogs listing.

References

External links
Charlie Byrd's biography
Concord Records Official Site

1979 albums
Charlie Byrd albums
Concord Records albums